Acleris subnivana, the common acleris, is a species of moth of the family Tortricidae. It is found in North America, where it has been recorded from Arkansas, Illinois, Indiana, Kentucky, Maine, Maryland, Massachusetts, Michigan, Mississippi, New Brunswick, New Hampshire, New York, North Carolina, Ohio, Oklahoma, Ontario, Pennsylvania, Quebec, South Carolina, Tennessee, West Virginia and Wisconsin.

The wingspan is 15–16 mm. The forewings are usually white with a grayish brown triangle in the middle of the costa. There is however some variation in the ground color, with some specimens being tan colored. Furthermore, some specimens have a slight pale brownish band. Adults have been recorded on wing year round.

The larvae feed on Vernonia and Quercus species (including Quercus rubra).

References

Moths described in 1863
subnivana
Moths of North America